Lucien Paul Noël Huteau (26 May 1878 – 16 February 1975) was a French football player who competed in the 1900 Olympic Games. In Paris he won a silver medal as a member of Club Française club team. He was born in Paris and died in Ercuis.
According to Reeves, captain of the Norwood and Selhurst Football Club interviewed in October 1900, he would have held his place very well in a great English team.

References

External links

1878 births
1975 deaths
French footballers
Olympic silver medalists for France
Olympic footballers of France
Footballers at the 1900 Summer Olympics
Olympic medalists in football
Medalists at the 1900 Summer Olympics
Association football goalkeepers
Footballers from Paris